Novinka is a rural locality (a selo) in Novopetrovsky Selsoviet of Blagoveshchensky District, Amur Oblast, Russia. The population was 151 as of 2018. There are 5 streets.

Geography 
Novinka is located 49 km north of Blagoveshchensk (the district's administrative centre) by road. Yegoryevka is the nearest rural locality.

References 

Rural localities in Blagoveshchensky District, Amur Oblast